Alfred Christensen (16 May 1914 - 29 September 1996) was a Danish sprint canoeist who competed in the late 1940s. He won a silver medal in the K-2 500 m event at the 1948 ICF Canoe Sprint World Championships in London.

Christensen competed at the 1948 Summer Olympics, also held in London, finishing fourth in the K-2 10000 m event.
Note that the K-2 500 m event did not become an official event at the Summer Olympics until the 1976 Games in Montreal. The event has been on the Olympic program since then.

References

Sports-reference.com profile

1914 births
1996 deaths
Canoeists at the 1948 Summer Olympics
Danish male canoeists
Olympic canoeists of Denmark
ICF Canoe Sprint World Championships medalists in kayak

da:Alfred Christensen